Dogan Mehmet (born in Brighton, England, on 31 March 1990) is a British stage performer and musician of Turkish Cypriot descent. Mehmet writes a mixture of English and Turkish Cypriot folk songs and tunes. He was a finalist in 2008's BBC Young Folk Awards; in the same year his EP "Unlimited" was released and his album "Gypsyhead" in November 2009. Work started on his second album in the snowy winter of 2010 and 'Outlandish' was subsequently released in 2012. Mehmet attended Newcastle University to study Folk and Traditional Music from 2008-2013 and between this he was a member of the percussion group STOMP.

As of early 2013, Mehmet joined the London West End theatre production War Horse as songman.

References

External links
Official Website
Doğan Mehmet at last.fm
Dogan Mehmet & The Deerhunters

Living people
British folk singers
People from Brighton
English people of Turkish Cypriot descent
1990 births
21st-century British singers
21st-century British male singers